Kadambur was a state assembly constituency in Tamil Nadu. It was in existence from 1952 to 1962 state elections.

Members of Legislative Assembly

Election results

1957

1952

References

External links
 

Former assembly constituencies of Tamil Nadu